These are the official results of the Women's heptathlon competition at the 1986 European Championships in Stuttgart, West Germany, held at Neckarstadion on 29 and 30 August 1986.

Medalists

Results

Final
29/30 August

Participation
According to an unofficial count, 19 athletes from 11 countries participated in the event.

 (1)
 (1)
 (3)
 (1)
 (1)
 (1)
 (3)
 (1)
 (2)
 (3)
 (2)

See also
 1982 Women's European Championships Heptathlon (Athens)
 1983 Women's World Championships Heptathlon (Helsinki)
 1984 Women's Olympic Heptathlon (Los Angeles)
 1986 Hypo-Meeting
 1987 Women's World Championships Heptathlon (Rome)
 1988 Women's Olympic Heptathlon (Seoul)
 1990 Women's European Championships Heptathlon (Split)

References

 Results

Heptathlon
Combined events at the European Athletics Championships
1986 in women's athletics